New Heart is a 2007 South Korean television series, starring Ji Sung, Kim Min-jung, Cho Jae-hyun and Lee Ji-hoon. Directed by Park Hong-kyun and written by Hwang Eun-kyung, it aired on MBC from December 12, 2007 to February 28, 2008 on Wednesdays and Thursdays at 21:55 for 23 episodes.

Synopsis
New Heart is a drama about heart surgeons who work in the thoracic surgery department of the fictional Kwanghee University Hospital.

Lee Eun-sung (Ji Sung) graduated from a newly established medical school in the provinces. He applies for a residency program the hospital and has high hopes of becoming a great doctor, despite his poor performance academically. Nam Hye-suk (Kim Min-jung) graduated at top of her medical school and is the first person to achieve perfect scores.

Eun-sung and Hye-suk's characters are opposites. Eun-sung is impulsive and compassionate, but lacks sound medical practice.  Hye-suk is calculating and cold, but has a brilliant mind. They both must prove themselves to the new head of the Department of Thoracic and Cardiovascular Surgery, Choi Kang-guk (Cho Jae-hyun). He believes only a very specific kind of person is capable of being a cardiothoracic surgeon. Although he is a medical genius, he is stubborn and refuses to maintain the status quo and abide by hospital policies. Eun-sung and Hye-suk are the only applicants for the cardiothoracic residency positions at Kwanghee University Hospital. Dr. Choi is forced to accept them whilst attempting to restore the reputation of the cardiothoracic department of the hospital.

Famous actor Lee Dong-gwon (Lee Ji-hoon) is admitted into the hospital for cardiac arrhythmia. He immediately falls in love with Hye-suk, who was his classmate from elementary school. A love triangle develops as Dong-gwon becomes jealous when he observes the developing relationship between Eun-sung and Hye-suk.

Cast

Main cast
 Ji Sung as Lee Eun-sung
 Kim Min-jung as Nam Hye-suk
 Cho Jae-hyun as Choi Kang-gook

Supporting cast
 Lee Ji-hoon as Lee Dong-kwon
 Jung Ho-keun as Min Young-kyu
 Jang Hyun-sung as Kim Tae-joon
 Sung Dong-il as Lee Seung-jae
 Lee Ki-young as Kim Jung-gil
 Jung Dong-hwan as Park Jae-hyun
 Park Kwang-jung as Kim Young-hee
 Seo Yoo-jung as Ms. Jung
 Park Chul-min as Bae Dae-ro
 Kang Ji-hoo as Woo In-tae
 Shin Dong-mi as Jo Min-ah
 Kim Jun-ho as Seol Rae-hyun
 Jung Kyung-soon as Jo Bok-gil
 Lee Eung-kyung as Kim Hye-sook
 Lee Chang-joo as Lee In-ho
 Son Yeo-eun as Choi Hyun-jung
 Shin Da-eun as Kim Mi-mi

Extended cast
 Jo Myung-jin as Kim Ji-hyun
 Jung Chan as Heo Tae-jin
 Kim Hye-eun as Yoo Hee-jin
 Yoo Jung-suk as Jae-sub
 Jang Se-yoon as Nurse 
 Lee Seol-hee as Nurse 
 Jung Yi-do as Min-chul
 Min Ji-oh as Lee Pil-joo
 Jung Yoon-seok as Kim Jung-min
 Kim Yoo-jung as Yoon-ah (guest)
 Eun Ji-won as (guest)
 Ryu Ui-hyun

Awards and nominations

International broadcast
It aired in Japan on Fuji TV in 2010 as part of the network's "Hallyu Alpha Summer Festival."
It aired in Thailand on Channel 7 from October 29, 2010 to December 9, 2010, under the title P̄h̀ā rạk phis̄ūcn̒ h̄ạwcı.
The series will be broadcast in 2018 with Persian dubbing from Iran's National Television Channel 2.

References

External links
 New Heart official MBC website 
 New Heart at MBC Global Media
 

MBC TV television dramas
2007 South Korean television series debuts
2008 South Korean television series endings
Korean-language television shows
South Korean medical television series
Television series by JS Pictures